This is a list of properties and districts in Greene County, Georgia that are listed on the National Register of Historic Places (NRHP).

Current listings

|}

Former listings

|}

References

Greene
Buildings and structures in Greene County, Georgia